The UD Kuzer (kana:UD・クーザー) is a line of light commercial vehicles produced by UD Trucks  with Volvo Group.

About
It's not for Japan.

In 2017, the Kuzer was introduced in Indonesia.

See also

UD Trucks
UD Kazet
UD Croner
UD Quester
UD SLF
UD BRT

References

Kuzer
Cab over vehicles
Vehicles introduced in 2017